Marjorie Woodworth (June 5, 1919 – August 23, 2000) was an American actress.

Born in Inglewood, California, she was a drum majorette at the University of Southern California.

Woodworth appeared in the films Dance, Girl, Dance, Road Show, Broadway Limited, Niagara Falls, All-American Co-Ed, Brooklyn Orchid, Flying with Music, The McGuerins from Brooklyn, Prairie Chickens, Yanks Ahoy, A Wave, a WAC and a Marine,  Salty O'Rourke, You Came Along, In Fast Company and Decoy.

References

External links
 

1919 births
2000 deaths
20th-century American actresses
American film actresses
Actresses from Los Angeles